Fact or Fiction may refer to:

 Beyond Belief: Fact or Fiction or Strange Truth: Fact or Fiction, a U.S. anthology TV series on FOX
 Alien Autopsy: Fact or Fiction, predecessor to Beyond Belief: Fact or Fiction
 Food: Fact or Fiction?, a U.S. TV series on Cooking Channel
 Wikipedia: Fact or Fiction?, a web series on Loudwire

See also

 Fact (disambiguation)
 Fiction (disambiguation)